Horacio Gabriel Carabajal (born 9 December 1991) is an Argentine professional footballer who plays as a midfielder for Santos.

Club career

Early career
He made his senior debut for the club during the season, and scored his first senior goal on 25 March of that year, netting through a penalty in a 3–2 away loss against Atlético Bucaramanga.

Talleres
Upon returning to Argentina, Carabajal remained four months without a club before going on a trial period at Talleres. He was unable to play for a period, after having troubles with his documentation, and only made his debut for the side on 4 September 2011, in a 3–1 home win over Sportivo Belgrano. He scored his first goal for the side three days later, in a Copa Argentina 4–1 home success over General Paz Juniors.

Carabajal scored his first league goal for Talleres on 11 March 2012, netting his team's second in a 4–1 home routing of Douglas Haig. He was a regular starter in the club's promotion campaign to the Primera B Nacional, being close to a move to Godoy Cruz in July 2013.

Loan to Universidad San Martín
On 23 January 2015, Carabajal joined Universidad San Martín of the Peruvian Primera División on loan. His debut for Universidad San Martín occurred on 7 February, in a Torneo del Inca win against Juan Aurich, while his league debut came on 2 May, in a 1–1 away draw against Melgar.

Carabajal left the club in December 2015, after one goal in 30 appearances.

Godoy Cruz
On 3 January 2016, Carabajal moved to Godoy Cruz in the Argentine Primera División on loan for 18 months. He started his career at the club by scoring twice in seven appearances, before being sidelined for two months due to an injury.

On 4 August 2016, Carabajal signed for the club permanently after Fernando Godoy moved in the opposite direction.

Loan to San Martín de San Juan
On 23 July 2017, after losing his starting spot at Godoy Cruz, Carabajal joined fellow top tier club San Martín de San Juan on loan.

Patronato
On 22 June 2018, Carabajal signed for Patronato, also in the first division. He scored a career-best six goals for the side during the season, as the club avoided relegation.

Unión Santa Fe
On 4 July 2019, Carabajal agreed to a three-year contract with Unión de Santa Fe, with the club acquiring 50% of his economic rights.

Argentinos Juniors
On 17 February 2021, after just five matches in the previous campaign, Carabajal joined Argentinos Juniors on loan until December. A regular starter, he was bought outright by the club on 19 December, for a US$ 500,000 fee.

Santos
On 12 August 2022, Carabajal was announced at Campeonato Brasileiro Série A side Santos, signing a four-year contract, for a rumoured fee of US$ 1.5 million. He made his debut for the club ten days later, starting in a 1–0 home win over São Paulo.

Carabajal scored his first goal for the club on 25 October 2022, netting his side's second in a 3–2 away loss against Flamengo.

Personal life
A declared fan of Lionel Messi, Carabajal has two tattoos of the player on his left leg.

Career statistics
.

Honours
Talleres
Torneo Argentino A: 2012–13

References

External links

1991 births
Living people
Footballers from Córdoba, Argentina
Argentine footballers
Association football midfielders
Argentine expatriate footballers
Expatriate footballers in Brazil
Expatriate footballers in Colombia
Expatriate footballers in Peru
Argentine expatriate sportspeople in Brazil
Argentine expatriate sportspeople in Colombia
Argentine expatriate sportspeople in Peru
Categoría Primera B players
Torneo Argentino A players
Primera Nacional players
Torneo Federal A players
Peruvian Primera División players
Argentine Primera División players
Campeonato Brasileiro Série A players
Patriotas Boyacá footballers
Talleres de Córdoba footballers
Club Deportivo Universidad de San Martín de Porres players
Godoy Cruz Antonio Tomba footballers
San Martín de San Juan footballers
Club Atlético Patronato footballers
Unión de Santa Fe footballers
Argentinos Juniors footballers
Santos FC players